Metin Kazak (born 29 July 1972) is a Bulgarian-Turkish politician and former Member of the European Parliament (MEP).

Biography
Kazak is a member of Movement for Rights and Freedoms. He was first elected to the European Parliament in 2007, and re-elected in 2009.

In 1997, he attained a master's degree in international and European law from Université de Bourgogne, Dijon, France.

References

External links
European Parliament profile

1972 births
Living people
Bulgarian Muslims
Bulgarian people of Turkish descent
MEPs for Bulgaria 2007–2009
MEPs for Bulgaria 2009–2014